Nokomis is a character in Ojibwe traditional stories.

Nokomis may also refer to:

Places

Canada
 Nokomis, Saskatchewan, Canada

United States
 Nokomis, Alabama
 Nokomis, Florida
 Nokomis, Illinois
 Nokomis, Minneapolis, Minnesota, a neighborhood
 Nokomis, Virginia
 Nokomis, Wisconsin

Other
 , two ships with the name